Efendiyeva is a female form of the surname Efendiyev. Notable people with the surname include:

Adaviye Efendiyeva (1879-1944), Crimean Tatar weaver and embroider
Mir-Hamza Efendiyev (born 1950), Azerbaijani diplomat
Samira Efendiyeva (born 1991), better known as Samira Efendi, Azerbaijani singer

Azerbaijani-language surnames